Endurance (also related to sufferance, resilience, constitution, fortitude, and hardiness) is the ability of an organism to exert itself and remain active for a long period of time, as well as its ability to resist, withstand, recover from and have immunity to trauma, wounds or fatigue. It is usually used in aerobic or anaerobic exercise. The definition of 'long' varies according to the type of exertion – minutes for high intensity anaerobic exercise, hours or days for low intensity aerobic exercise. Training for endurance can reduce the ability to exert endurance strength unless an individual also undertakes resistance training to counteract this effect.

When a person is able to accomplish or withstand a higher amount of effort than their original capabilities their endurance is increasing which to many personnel indicates progress. In looking to improve one's endurance they may slowly increase the amount of repetitions or time spent, if higher repetitions are taken rapidly muscle strength improves while less endurance is gained. Increasing endurance has been proven to release endorphins resulting in a positive mind. The act of gaining endurance through physical activity has been shown to decrease anxiety, depression, and stress, or any chronic disease in total. Although a greater endurance can assist the cardiovascular system it does not imply that any cardiovascular disease can be guaranteed to improve. "The major metabolic consequences of the adaptations of muscle to endurance exercise are a slower utilization of muscle glycogen and blood glucose, a greater reliance on fat oxidation, and less lactate production during exercise of a given intensity."

The term stamina is sometimes used synonymously and interchangeably with endurance.
In military settings, endurance is considered the ability of a force to sustain high levels of combat potential relative to its opponent over the duration of a campaign.

Endurance may also refer to an ability to persevere through a difficult situation.

Training 

Different types of endurance performance can be trained in specific ways. Adaptation of exercise plans should follow individual goals.

Calculating the Intensity of exercise the individual capabilities should be considered. Effective training starts within half the individual performance capability. Performance capability is expressed by maximum heart rate. Best results can be achieved within 55 up to 65% of maximum heart rate. Aerobic, anaerobic and further thresholds are not to be mentioned within extensive endurance exercises. In general surveillance of training intensity is achieved through measuring the heart rate.

Endurance-trained effects are mediated by epigenetic mechanisms

In the 10 years between 2012 and 2019 at least 25 reports have indicated a major role of epigenetic mechanisms in skeletal muscle responses to exercise.

Exercise-induced regulation of genes in muscles

Gene expression in muscle is largely regulated, as in tissues generally, by regulatory DNA sequences, especially enhancers.   Enhancers are non-coding sequences in the genome that activate the expression of distant target genes, by looping around and interacting with the promoters of their target genes (see Figure "Regulation of transcription in mammals").  As reported by Williams et al., the average distance in the loop between the connected enhancers and promoters of genes is 239,000 nucleotide bases.

Endurance exercise-induced long-term alteration of gene expression by histone acetylation or deacetylation

After exercise, epigenetic alterations to enhancers alter long-term expression of hundreds of muscle genes.  This includes genes producing proteins and other products secreted into the systemic circulation, many of which may act as endocrine messengers.  Of 817 genes with altered expression, 157 (according to Uniprot) or 392 (according to Exocarta) of the proteins produced were known to be secreted from the muscles.  Four days after an endurance type of exercise, many genes have persistently altered, epigentically regulated expression.  Four pathways altered were in the platelet/coagulation system, the cognitive system, the cardiovascular system, and the renal system.  Epigenetic regulation of these genes was indicated by epigenetic alterations in the distant upstream DNA regulatory sequences of the enhancers of these genes.  

Up-regulated genes had epigenetic acetylations added at histone 3 lysine 27 (H3k27ac) of nucleosomes located at the enhancers controlling those up-regulated genes, while down-regulated genes had epigenetic acetylations removed from H3K27 in nucleosomes located at the enhancers that control those genes (see Figure "A nucleosome with histone tails set for transcriptional activation").  Biopsies of the vastus lateralis muscle showed expression of 13,108 genes at baseline before an exercise training program.  Six sedentary 23-year-old Caucasian males provided vastus lateralis biopsies before entering an exercise program (six weeks of 60-minute sessions of riding a stationary cycle, five days per week).  Four days after the exercise program was completed, biopsies of the same muscles had altered gene expression, with 641 genes up-regulated and 176 genes down-regulated.  Williams et al. identified 599 enhancer-gene interactions, covering 491 enhancers and 268 genes, where both the enhancer and the connected target gene were coordinately either upregulated or downregulated after exercise training.

Endurance exercise-induced alteration to gene expression by DNA methylation or demethylation

Endurance muscle training also alters muscle gene expression through epigenetic DNA methylation or de-methylation of CpG sites within enhancers.  In a study by Lindholm et al., twenty-three 27-year-old, sedentary, male and female volunteers had endurance training on only one leg during 3 months.  The other leg was used as an untrained control leg.  Skeletal muscle biopsies from the vastus lateralis were taken both before training began and 24 hours after the last training session from each of the legs.  The endurance-trained leg, compared to the untrained leg, had significant DNA methylation changes at 4,919 sites across the genome.  The sites of altered DNA methylation were predominantly in enhancers. Transcriptional analysis, using RNA sequencing, identified 4,076 differentially expressed genes.    

The transcriptionally upregulated genes were associated with enhancers that had a significant decrease in DNA methylation, while transcriptionally downregulated genes were associated with enhancers that had increased DNA methylation. In this study, the differentially methylated positions in enhancers with increased methylation were mainly associated with genes involved in structural remodeling of the muscle and glucose metabolism.  The differentially decreased methylated positions in enhancers were associated with genes functioning in inflammatory/immunological processes and transcriptional regulation.

See also

Exercise

References

External links

 .

Athletic training
Physical exercise
Physical fitness